The European Combined Events Team Championships is a track and field competition for European combined track and field events specialists, with contests in men's decathlon event and women's heptathlon. It is organised by European Athletics. It was held annualy in 1993–2011 and biennialy in 1973–1993 and 2011–2019. 

It was known as the European Cup Combined Events prior to 2017.

Format
It is an international team event, where the points of each nation's top three performers are tallied to form an overall team score. The European Cup Combined Events takes place in three separate divisions – the Super, First, and Second Leagues – and nations gain promotion and relegation between the leagues depending upon their performance.  Since 2013 there is a single overall competition winner determined by a combination of men's and women's performances, rather than as separate competitions for men and women. The three league contests take place over the same two-day period, but are held at different European locations.

The event provides multi-eventers with the opportunity to take part in national team events that is afforded to individual event athletes by the European Athletics Team Championships, the European Marathon Cup, the European Half Marathon Cup and the team events at the European Cross Country Championships.

History
Organised by the European Athletic Association (EAA), the competition was first held in Bonn, West Germany in 1973 as a biennial event for men's decathlon and women's pentathlon. The women's heptathlon superseded the pentathlon in 1981. For the first five editions (1973–1981), the competition featured semi-final and final stages, but a league format with A, B and C divisions was adopted at the 1983 event. The biennial schedule was changed to an annual one from the 1993 Cup onwards, at which point the league names took on their current titles. Since 2011 the competition does not take place in Olympic years.

The competition is one of a series of international team athletics competitions held by the EAA on a yearly basis, alongside the European Team Championships for individual track and field events, the European Cup 10000m, European Cup Race Walking and the European Cup Winter Throwing meet.

Individual performances in the Super league section of the competition qualify for the IAAF World Combined Events Challenge, which is an international series for athletes competing in combined events.

Super league / A Finals / Finals

Editions

Medallists

Individual men (decathlon)

Individual women

Pentathlon

Heptathlon

Men's team

Women's team

Overall Team

First league / B Finals / Semi-Finals

Editions

Men's winners
1973:  &  & 
1975:  &  & 
1977:  &  &  & 
1979:  &  & 
1981:  &  & 
1983: 
1985: 
1987: 
1989: 
1991: 
1993: 
1994: 
1995: 
1996: 
1997: 
1998: 
1999: 
2000: 
2001: 
2002: 
2003: 
2004: 
2005: 
2006:

Women's winners
1973:  &  & 
1975:  &  & 
1977:  &  &  & 
1979:  &  & 
1981:  &  & 
1983: 
1985: 
1987: 
1989: 
1991: 
1993: 
1994: 
1995: 
1996: 
1997: 
1998: 
1999: 
2000: 
2001: 
2002: 
2003: 
2004: 
2005: 
2006:

Second league / C Finals

Editions

Men's winners
1983: 
1985:  & 
1987: 
1989: 
1991: 
1993:  & 
1994:  & 
1995:  & 
1996: 
1997: 
1998:  & 
1999: 
2000: 
2001: 
2002: 
2003: 
2004: 
2005: 
2006: 
2007: 
2008: 
2009:

Women's winners
1983: 
1985:  & 
1987: 
1989: 
1991: 
1993:  & 
1994:  & 
1995:  & 
1996: 
1997: 
1998:  & 
1999: 
2000: 
2001: 
2002: 
2003: 
2004: 
2005: 
2006: 
2007: 
2008: 
2009:

References

External links
Official website

Cup Combined
Annual track and field meetings
Decathlon
Recurring sporting events established in 1973
Heptathlon
Combined events competitions
 
1973 establishments in Europe